Asapharcha crateropa is a species of moth in the family Gelechiidae. It was described by Edward Meyrick in 1930. It is found in Mozambique.

The wingspan is about 18 mm. The forewings are ochreous-white, irregularly irrorated (speckled) grey, tending to form obscure transverse strigulae, some more distinct grey strigulae towards the termen. The stigmata form moderate black spots, the first discal round, the plical oval, beneath and almost confluent with it, the second
discal narrow, transverse, followed by a fascia of grey suffusion, a narrower terminal fascia attenuated downwards. The hindwings are grey.

References

Endemic fauna of Mozambique
Gelechiinae
Moths described in 1930
Moths of Africa